The Al Hillah bombing killed 127 people, chiefly men lining up to join the Iraqi police forces, at the recruiting centre on February 28, 2005 in Al Hillah, Iraq.

The bombing caused a worsening of Iraqi-Jordanian diplomatic relations after it was learned that suicide bomber, Raed Mansour al-Banna, had come from Jordan. Banna's family in Jordan gave him a heroic funeral, angering many Iraqi Shia. Thousands protested outside the Jordanian embassy in Baghdad and demanded it close, and the dispute led to both countries recalling their respective ambassadors.

Al-Banna had earlier tried to enter the United States in July 2003, although he was turned away at O'Hare Airport as he possessed "multiple terrorist risk factors".

References

External links 
MASSACRE IN HILLA
Iraq suicide bomb kills at least 125 CNN
Bio of the bomber Frontline

2005 murders in Iraq
21st-century mass murder in Iraq
Attacks in Iraq in 2005
Foreign relations of Iraq
Foreign relations of Jordan
Suicide car and truck bombings in Iraq
Marketplace attacks in Iraq
Terrorist incidents in Iraq in 2005
Iraq–Jordan relations
Mass murder in 2005
February 2005 events in Iraq
Hillah